The U.S. Flammable Fabrics Act is an act that was passed in 1953 to regulate the manufacture of highly flammable clothing.  It was enacted after a series of tragic deaths in the 1940s involving children who were wearing long rayon pile cowboy chaps or brushed rayon sweaters.  The Federal Trade Commission was initially placed as the enforcement authority but this responsibility was later transferred over to the Consumer Product Safety Commission in 1967 when the act was amended to include interior furnishings, paper, plastic, foam, and other materials used in wearing apparel and interior furnishings. The Consumer Product Safety Commission was given the authority, under the U.S. Flammable Fabrics Act, to issue mandatory flammability standards.  Flammability standards for clothing textiles, vinyl plastic film in clothing, carpets, rugs, children's sleepwear, mattresses, and mattress pads have all been established.

Amendment to 1953 Act
90th United States Congress cleared Senate bill  on December 1, 1967. U.S. President
Lyndon B. Johnson enacted the Flammable Fabrics Act Amendment on December 14, 1967.

See also
Fire Research and Safety Act of 1968

References

External links
 
 

1953 in American law
83rd United States Congress
Fire prevention
Fire prevention law
Textile industry of the United States